Frank T. Cary (December 14, 1920 – January 1, 2006) was an American executive and businessman. Cary served as the Chairman of IBM from 1973 to 1983 and CEO from 1973 to 1981.

Early life and education

Frank Taylor Cary was born on December 14, 1920, in Gooding, Idaho, the son of Dr. Frank T. Cary and Ida Hayden. After a short period of his birth, the family moved to Inglewood, California. He earned a bachelor's degree from the University of California, Los Angeles in 1943, then in 1948 earned his M.B.A. from Stanford Graduate School of Business.

Career

IBM
Cary joined IBM in 1948 as a salesman in Los Angeles. He held a variety of management positions and became president of the Data Processing Division in 1964. Advancing through the management ranks, he became general manager of data processing and vice president after two years, then became a senior vice president in 1967, in the following year, he was appointed as a member of the board of directors, then joined the Corporate Office and the Management Review Committee. In January 1973, Cary was named Chairman and CEO.

During his tenure as chief executive at IBM, he presided over a period of rapid growth in product, revenue and profit. His most notable accomplishment was recognizing that the personal computer was going to be an emerging product category that could ultimately be a threat to IBM. Consequently, he forced the creation of a special, small dedicated group to spearhead an answer to Apple, within IBM but totally protected from the internal bureaucracy of a large corporation.

He stepped down from his position in 1981, remained a director until 1991.

Boards and Committees
Cary was Chairman of biotechnology company Celgene Corporation from 1986 to 1990. He was a member of the Steering Committee of the Bilderberg Group.

He joined the MIT Corporation in 1974 and became a life member in 1984. He served on several committees, including the committee of Electrical Engineering and Computer Science.

He served on the board of directors of JP Morgan, ABC, Texaco, and others. He also served on boards of many nonprofit organizations, including the American Museum of Natural History and Rockefeller University.

Personal life and death

He was married to Anne (Curtis) Cary. They raised three sons, and a daughter. His hobbies included skiing, tennis, and golf. He died at the age of 85, at his home in Darien, Connecticut, on New Year's Day 2006.

References

External links
 Official Biography on IBM website

1920 births
2006 deaths
People from Gooding, Idaho
IBM employees
Members of the Steering Committee of the Bilderberg Group
People from Darien, Connecticut
American technology chief executives
American chief executives of Fortune 500 companies
20th-century American businesspeople
Stanford University alumni
University of California, Los Angeles alumni